Helicostylis heterotricha is a species of plant in the family Moraceae. It is endemic to Brazil.

References

Flora of Brazil
heterotricha
Endangered plants
Taxonomy articles created by Polbot